Abdulkadir Abdulsalam was a Nigerian politician, who served as Chairman of the Labour Party Nigeria.

References 

Labour Party (Nigeria) politicians